The Superintendent of the Puerto Rico Police is the highest-ranking officer, administrator, and director of the Puerto Rico Police, and an ex officio member of the Commission on Safety and Public Protection as well. The Superintendent is appointed by the Governor of Puerto Rico with advice and consent from the Senate. Superintendents have also typically being simultaneously appointed as Commissioners of Safety and Public Protection due to the nature of their job and experience.

The rank of Superintendent has existed since 1952; Before that, from 1899 to 1956, the rank was known as Chief of the Puerto Rico Police.

Chiefs of Police

Superintendents

References

Puerto Rico Commission on Safety and Public Protection
Puerto Rico Police
 
1956 establishments in Puerto Rico